Jack Hirshleifer (August 26, 1925 – July 26, 2005) was an American economist and long-time professor at the University of California, Los Angeles.

He received a B.S. from Harvard University in 1945 and a Ph.D. in 1950. He worked at the RAND Corporation in Santa Monica from 1949 to 1955.   He then taught at the University of Chicago from 1955 to 1960, and at UCLA until 2001.  Hirshleifer was well known for his work on uncertainty and information in economics, the economic analysis of conflict, and bioeconomics. His undergraduate textbook, Price Theory and Applications, went into seven editions. A 1958 article by Hirshleifer began the triumphant comeback of Irving Fisher's theory of capital and interest, now deemed canonical.  While at Rand Corporation, Hirshleifer wrote a report which tore apart the Department of Water and Power's feasibility report for the Oroville Dam, noting among other things that the report failed to include the cost of building the dam. The dam ended up being built. (Cadillac Desert, Chapter 10).

Bibliography

 Hirshleifer, Jack (1970). Investment, Interest, and Capital, Prentice/Hall International
 Hirshleifer, Jack (June 1973). "Exchange Theory: The Missing Chapter." Western Economic Journal (Economic Inquiry) 11: 129-146
 Hirshleifer, Jack (1976). Price Theory and Applications, Prentice/Hall International
 Hirshleifer, Jack (January 1983). "From weakest-link to best-shot: The voluntary provision of public goods", Public Choice, Vol. 41, Number 3, pp. 371–386.
 Hirshleifer, Jack (1994). The Analytics of Uncertainty and Information. Cambridge: Cambridge University Press
 Hirshleifer, Jack (2001). The dark side of the force: economic foundations of conflict theory. Cambridge: Cambridge University Press

External links
Biography at New School web page
Obituary

1925 births
2005 deaths
Deaths from prostate cancer
Harvard University alumni
University of Chicago faculty
University of California, Los Angeles faculty
Information economists
21st-century American economists
20th-century American economists
Fellows of the Econometric Society
Distinguished Fellows of the American Economic Association